= Genealogy Today =

Website

Genealogy Today is a genealogical and historical record website focused primarily on the United States with limited records from Canada and several other European countries. The site contains over 4.3 million records from over 6,600 original documents, along with several thousand original articles and miscellaneous images. All information on this site is cataloged and searchable by name. The site offers a combination of free and subscription-based resources.

== History ==
The web site was launched in 1999 by Illya D'Addezio with the purpose of highlighting new and unique resources available to genealogists. Within the next three years, several niche web sites would be acquired and integrated, and a team of writers was assembled to create original content.

In 2001, Genealogy Today acquired the rights to and archived materials of a newsletter with the same name that had been launched in April 1997 by The Genealogy Lady, along with responsibility for the GenToday-L mailing list. At the same time, a collection of online databases, references, and articles co-hosted with that newsletter at Enoch.com was also acquired.

As the free information available on Genealogy Today grew, so did the demand for (and interest in offering) more exclusive articles and vital records. In the Fall of 2003, a database of transcribed records from original sources—mostly smaller in size and published in limited quantities than a genealogist would find elsewhere—was soft-launched, and in the Spring of 2004 formally released.

Our collection of World War 2 Ration Books grew significantly in 2006, and was recognized by the Society of Ration Token Collectors (SRTC) as being the largest single collection of these relics from the 1940s. The collection of Funeral Card images also reflects the creative sources this site compiles.

In 2007, in a partnership with (the then independent) ProGenealogists, Inc., the Family Roots Radio series was launched. The shows were hosted by well-known genealogical author, speaker and researcher, Kory L. Meyerink.

One significant milestone in 2011, was the inclusion of the Genealogy Today (transcription, ephemera and article) catalogs into the WorldCat Local database.
